Louie J. Chapman is a New Zealand rugby union player who plays for the Tasman Mako in the Bunnings NPC competition. His position of choice is Halfback.

Tasman 
In September 2020 Chapman was named as an injury replacement in the Tasman Mako squad for the 2020 Mitre 10 Cup. He played 5 games for the Mako in the 2020 season as they went on to win their second premiership title in a row.

References

External links
itsrugby.co.uk profile

New Zealand rugby union players
Living people
Tasman rugby union players
Rugby union scrum-halves
People educated at Christchurch Boys' High School
2000 births
Rugby union players from Christchurch